Moonlight & Love Songs is an album by singer and songwriter Leon Russell and the Nashville Symphony. Russell departs from past albums to sing all songs written by other artists. The album was recorded in the 2002 in Nashville, Tennessee, and produced by Russell. The album was released on CD on April 9, 2002.

Track listing
Orchestra Tuning	0:20 		
The Very Thought of You  (Ray Noble)	4:12 		
That's All  (Alan Brandt / Bob Haymes)	3:05 		
My Funny Valentine (Lorenz Hart / Richard Rodgers)	3:46 		
Smoke Gets in Your Eyes (Otto Harbach / Jerome Kern) 3:24 		
Stormy Weather (Harold Arlen / Ted Koehler)	3:22 		
Once in a While  (Michael Edwards / Bud Green) 4:13 		
That Lucky Old Sun (Just Rolls Around Heaven All Day) (Haven Gillespie / Harry B. Smith)	5:18 
'Round Midnight  (Bernie Hanighen / Thelonious Monk / Cootie Williams)	3:38 		
The Shadow of Your Smile  (Johnny Mandel / Paul Francis Webster)	4:25 		
As Time Goes By (song) (Herman Hupfeld) 3:41 		
Angel Eyes  (Earl Brent / Matt Dennis)  4:18

Personnel
Leon Russell:	Keyboards, Piano, Vocals 
Edgar Winter: 	Sax (Alto) 
Jim Price :	Trumpet
Nashville Symphony
Bruce Hornsby Piano on "That Lucky Old Sun"

References

External links
Youtube Leon Russell Goodnight Irene in Studio

Leon Russell discography
Leon Russell lyrics
Leon Russell Records
Leon Russell NAMM Oral History Program Interview (2012)

2002 albums
Leon Russell albums